Virbia semirosea is a moth in the family Erebidae first described by Herbert Druce in 1889. It is found in Mexico and on Hispaniola.

References

semirosea
Moths described in 1889